The list of Lithuanian records might refer to:

List of Lithuanian records in archery
List of Lithuanian records in athletics
List of Lithuanian records in Olympic weightlifting
List of Lithuanian records in swimming
List of Lithuanian records in track cycling

See also
:Category:Albums by Lithuanian artists

Records